Kulwicki (feminine: Kulwicka, plural: Kulwiccy) is a Polish surname and may refer to:

People
 Alan Kulwicki (1954–1993), nicknamed "Polish Prince", American auto racing driver and team owner
 Dustin Kulwicki, Cave Story video game composer
  (born 1964), Polish basketball player
 Lech Kulwicki (born 1951), Polish footballer who played as a defender
 Rick Kulwicki (1961–2011), American rock guitarist of band The Fluid

Other 
 Kulwicki Motorsports Laboratory, at Charlotte Research Institute
 Kulwicki Driver Development Program (Kulwicki DDP), began in 2015 young drivers support competition 
 Alan Kulwicki Racing, a championship-winning NASCAR Winston Cup Series team

Polish-language surnames